Nataliya Svinukhova (born 20 May 1972) is a Russian former basketball player who competed in the 1996 Summer Olympics.

References

1972 births
Living people
Russian women's basketball players
Olympic basketball players of Russia
Basketball players at the 1996 Summer Olympics